Dalton L. McMichael High School is a public high school located in Mayodan, North Carolina.

History
The school was established as a merger of Madison-Mayodan and Stoneville high schools. Athletic programs of the two former schools (formerly the Falcons and Eagles, respectively) were merged in 1989, and the new facilities were opened in 1991. Madison-Mayodan High School qualified as a finalist in the Bands of America National Championships in 1976.

McMichael High School is the home of the 2004, 2007 NCHSAA 2A Dual Team State Championship Wrestling teams, led by Coach Jon Bullins; the 1995 NCHSAA 3-A Men's Tennis State Championship team, led by Coach Steve Spencer; and the 2009 NCHSAA 2A Baseball Championship team, led by Coach Mike Dalton.

The school is named after Dalton L. McMichael (1914–2001), a North Carolina textile executive and philanthropist.

Notable Dalton L. McMichael alumni 
 Beth Mitchell, educator and competitive shag dancer
 Allen Webster, Major League Baseball pitcher

Madison-Mayodan High School alumni and faculty 
 Linda Carter Brinson, writer, journalist, and editor
 Benny Carter, contemporary visual artist
 J. P. Carter, politician, military officer, and educator

References

Public high schools in North Carolina
Schools in Rockingham County, North Carolina